Alfred Gottfried Ochshorn (April 6, 1915 – October 23 (or 20), 1943) was a Jewish Austrian communist student activist and fighter during the Spanish Civil War. At the end of the Spanish Republic he went to France where he worked as a translator for German troops while also active in forging papers to aid the French Resistance. After being betrayed by an informant, he was arrested in 1943 by the Gestapo and sent to the Mauthausen concentration camp. He died after being shot by a guard, Martin Bartesch, during an escape attempt.

External links 
  

Austrian communists
Austrian expatriates in France
Jews in the French resistance
Austrian Jews who died in the Holocaust
People from Leopoldstadt
People who died in Mauthausen concentration camp
1915 births
1943 deaths
Resistance members who died in Nazi concentration camps
Austrian civilians killed in World War II
 deaths by firearm in Austria